Saving Yusuf is the 7th mixtape by American rapper Stalley. It was released on January 25, 2016.

Track listing

Sample credits
 "Came A Long Way" contains elements of "Chanson d'Un Jour d'Hiver" performed by Alain Mion & Cortex.

References

2016 mixtape albums
Maybach Music Group albums
Albums produced by FKi (production team)